Professor Andy Long FREng is the Vice-Chancellor and Chief Executive of Northumbria University, the fifth person to hold this role in the institution’s history.

Prior to becoming Vice-Chancellor, he was a member of staff at the University of Nottingham, where he served as Provost and Deputy Vice-Chancellor. Previously he was Dean and then Pro Vice-Chancellor for the Faculty of Engineering from 2011 to 2018.

Research areas and career 
Professor Long’s research interests are on the design and manufacture of polymer composites for demanding applications particularly in the aerospace, automotive and energy sectors.  

Professor Long was also Chair of the Executive Management Group for Midlands Innovation a partnership between Central England universities  
He has over 350 publications including around 130 refereed journal papers, co-authored/edited three textbooks on polymer composites, supervised over 30 successful PhD students, and been principal investigator for research grants totalling around £33million.

Awards 
 In 2006, Professor Long was awarded the Institute of Materials, Minerals and Mining (IoMMM) Rosenhain Medal in recognition of distinguished achievement in materials science.  
 In 2020, he was awarded the IoMMM Leslie Holliday Prize for significant contribution to the field of composite materials. 
 In 2019, he was elected Fellow of the Royal Academy of Engineering. In 2014 he was inducted as a SAMPE Fellow for significant contributions in materials and process engineering technology.

References 

Year of birth missing (living people)
Living people